The Starlighters were an American singing group of the mid 20th century.

The group was formed in 1946, the members being Pauline Byrns, Vince Degen, Tony Paris, Howard Hudson,  and future star Andy Williams, all alumni of Six Hits and a Miss. Williams soon left and was replaced by Jerry Duane. Byrns retired from singing in 1947. Imogene Lynn became the Starlighters' female vocalist in 1949.

The group performed mainly as backing vocalists, frequently backing Jo Stafford as well as many other artists on a number of singles. They also performed songs in cartoon and live short films and the feature films Song of Idaho (1948) and (uncredited) in Honeychile (1951) and With a Song in My Heart (1952). The Starlighters appeared on radio on The Chesterfield Supper Club and on television on The Jo Stafford Show.

References

External links

The Starlighters at PrettyFamous
The Starlighters at MusicBrainz

Musical groups established in 1946
Traditional pop music singers
American vocal groups